Renat Rudolfovich Yanbayev (born 7 April 1984) is a Russian association football official and a full-back (mostly left). He is aplayer and also the director of sports for Znamya Noginsk. He was born to an ethnic Russian mother and Volga Tatar father.

Career 
Yanbayev played for CSKA Moscow school and youth teams. He moved to Lokomotiv Moscow during the summer of 2007 from FC Kuban Krasnodar after featuring in 12 league games and scoring once in the 2007 Russian Premier League. Originally a left-sided midfielder, he was converted to left-back (he also can play as a right-back) in Lokomotiv Moscow.
Playing for Lokomotiv Moscow, Yanbayev was called to Russian national team.
In the beginning of the 2012–13 season, after the appointment of Slaven Bilić as a manager, Yanbayev lost his position in the starting XI to Andrey Yeshchenko. To gain playing time, he moved on loan to Zenit in September 2012. During winter transfer window in January 2013, when Yeshchenko departed for Anzhi, Yanbayev returned to Loko.

He left Lokomotiv as a free agent on 5 June 2017 after 10 seasons with the club. On 13 June 2017, he signed a two-year contract with FC Krasnodar. He was released from his Krasnodar contract by mutual consent on 24 July 2018.

International
In February 2008, he was called up to the Russia national football team.

Career statistics

Club

Honours

Club
Lokomotiv Moscow
Russian Cup: 2014–15, 2016–17

International
UEFA European Football Championship bronze medalist: 1
2008, Russian Federation

References

External links 
 Lokomotiv Moscow profile
 Profile at Football-Lineups.com

1984 births
Living people
Footballers from Moscow
Russian footballers
Association football defenders
Russia youth international footballers
Russia under-21 international footballers
Russia international footballers
People from Noginsk
Association football fullbacks
FC Anzhi Makhachkala players
FC Kuban Krasnodar players
FC Lokomotiv Moscow players
Tatar people of Russia
UEFA Euro 2008 players
FC Khimki players
FC Zenit Saint Petersburg players
FC Krasnodar players
PFC CSKA Moscow players
Russian Premier League players
Russian First League players
Russian Second League players